K&H Bank or Kereskedelmi és Hitelbank is one of the biggest  commercial banks in Hungary, owned by KBC Bank of Belgium.

K&H Bank has total assets of HUF 2 826 billion and K&H is one of the leading financial institutions in Hungary in terms of both retail and corporate services.

K&H Bank has a nationwide network of more than 200 branches. It offers a full range of financial products, including conventional products: account management, investments, savings, loans, bank guarantees, bank card services, custody management, treasury, project financing, Private Banking services etc., as well as investment fund management, leasing, securities trading, factoring, life and pension insurance. These latter services are offered through subsidiaries.

Main shareholder

The majority owner of K&H Bank’s is KBC Bank and Insurance Group of Belgium, with 100% ownership.

KBC Bank 
Since founded in 1998 following the merger of Kredietbank, ABB Insurance, and CERA Bank of Belgium, KBC Bank has been dynamically expanding in Europe. Its staff of nearly 43,000 serve nine million clients in 30 countries.
KBC focuses special attention on Central Europe, where it has acquired stakes in Polish, Czech, Slovakian, and Slovenian banks. Kredietbank, the legal predecessor of KBC Bank, entered the Hungarian market in 1997 as the winner of the privatisation tender of K&H Bank, in which it has now increased its initial participation of 23 percent to 100 percent.

By the end of 2021, K&H announced that it will have achieved carbon neutrality, with plans to reduce its carbon emissions to 80 percent by 2030 compared to 2015.

Sponsorship
The company has been the official jersery sponsor of the Hungarian national basketball team.

See also
 KBC Bank
 List of banks
 List of banks in Hungary

References

External links
K&H Bank official website

Banks of Hungary
Banks established in 1987
Companies based in Budapest
Hungarian companies established in 1987